Billie June McCaskill, better known as June McCaskill (June 2, 1930 – May 9, 2011), was an American herbarium curator at the University of California, Davis and expert in weed identification.

Life
McCaskill was born in Altadena, in California. She grew up in Pasadena where her family operated a nursery called McCaskill Gardens.

She attended Mills College in 1949, and graduated with a degree in Botany in 1951. She started her career at University of California, Davis in 1953, becoming the first curator of the Botany Department's Herbarium, a position that she held until her retirement. McCaskill specialised in the identification of weeds, and was particularly focused on agricultural weeds that were toxic to livestock. Her botanical skills were also used to investigate multiple homicides. She retired in 1991.

Published major work
Bill B. Fischer, Arthur H. Lange, June McCaskill, Beecher Crampton, and Betsey Tabraham, Growers Weed Identification Handbook (University of California), multiple editions.
John M. Tucker, and June McCaskill. “Heteranthera Limosa in California." Madroño, vol. 19, no. 2, 1967, pp. 64–64.

Legacy
The June McCaskill Plant Identification Laboratory of the University of California, Davis's Center for Plant Diversity herbaria opened in 2005. It was named in her honour.

The following cultivar was named in her honour by her father:
 Camellia japonica ‘June McCaskill.’

Botanical collections
Her collections of Californian weeds are held in various North American herbaria, including the University of California, Davis Herbarium, and the Agriculture and Agri-Food Canada National Collection of Vascular Plants. In Australasia, her specimens are held at the Auckland War Memorial Museum Herbarium, the Allan Herbarium, and the National Herbarium of Victoria, Royal Botanic Gardens Victoria.

References

1930 births
2001 deaths
American botanists
Plant collectors